The 2014 United States House of Representatives elections in Connecticut were held on Tuesday, November 4, 2014 to elect the five U.S. representatives from the state of Connecticut, one from each of the state's five congressional districts. The elections coincided with the elections of other federal and state offices, including Governor of Connecticut.

Democrats swept all five districts in 2014, bringing their winning streak in Connecticut U.S. House elections to 20 in a row – the second longest partisan winning streak in state history and the longest for the Democratic Party.

Overview
Results of the 2014 United States House of Representatives elections in Connecticut by district:

District 1

Democrat John B. Larson has represented this district since 1999. Matthew Corey previously challenged Larson as a petitioning candidate receiving 0.8% in the General Election. Corey is the Republican nominee.

General election

District 2

Democrat Joe Courtney has represented this district since 2007. Lori Hopkins-Cavanagh is the Republican nominee. Bill Clyde is running on the Green Party line. Dan Reale is the nominee for the Libertarian Party.

General election

District 3

Democrat Rosa DeLauro has represented this district since 1991. James Brown is the Republican nominee.

General election

District 4

Democrat Jim Himes has represented this district since 2009. Former State Senator Dan Debicella, who unsuccessfully challenged Himes as the Republican nominee in 2010; State Representative John Shaban; and former Navy SEAL Carl Higbie sought the Republican nomination with Debicella easily winning the primary election. Linda McMahon, a businesswoman who ran unsuccessfully for the United States Senate in 2010 and 2012, has been mentioned as a potential challenger to Himes; however, McMahon has stated that she does not plan to run for any office.

General election

District 5

Democrat Elizabeth Esty has represented this district since 2013. Andrew Roraback, the Republican nominee in 2012, has accepted a judgeship. Businessman Mark Greenberg, who ran for the Republican nomination for the House of Representatives in 2010 and 2012, is the Republican nominee.

General election

Polling

Results

See also
 2014 United States House of Representatives elections
 2014 United States elections

References

External links
U.S. House elections in Connecticut, 2014 at Ballotpedia
Campaign contributions at OpenSecrets

Connecticut
2014
United States House of Representatives